Charcoal is a blackish residue of impure carbon obtained by heating animal and vegetable substances.

Charcoal may also refer to:

Charcoal (album), the debut album by indie rock band Sarge
Charcoal (art), a dry art medium made of finely grounded organic materials held together by a binder
Charcoal (color), a colour that has the hue of charcoal
Charcoal (comics), a Marvel Comics character and member of the Thunderbolts
Charcoal (typeface), a sans-serif typeface designed by David Berlow of Font Bureau
Charcoal (film), a 2022 drama

See also
Charcoal filter (disambiguation)
Carbonari, or "charcoal burners"